These are the results for the girls' 10 metre air rifle event at the 2018 Summer Youth Olympics.

Results

Qualification

Final

References

External links

Qualification results
 Final results

Shooting at the 2018 Summer Youth Olympics